Alma, Wisconsin may refer to:

 Alma, Wisconsin, a city
 Alma, Buffalo County, Wisconsin, a town
 Alma, Jackson County, Wisconsin, a town
 Alma Center, Wisconsin, a village